Heaven is a 2002 romantic thriller film directed by Tom Tykwer, starring Cate Blanchett and Giovanni Ribisi. Co-screenwriter Krzysztof Kieślowski intended for it to be the first part of a trilogy (the second being Hell and the third titled Purgatory), but Kieślowski died before he could complete the project. The film is an international co-production among producers based in Germany, France, Italy, the United States, and the United Kingdom. The dialogue is in Italian and English.

Plot
The film is set in Turin, Italy. It opens with a prologue sequence showing the young Italian Carabinieri clerk Filippo (Ribisi) learning to fly a helicopter using a flight simulator. When he accidentally crashes the virtual helicopter by ascending too dramatically, his instructor tells him, "In a real helicopter, you can't just keep going up and up", prompting Filippo to ask, "How high can I fly?"

The film then cuts to Philippa (Blanchett), who is preparing to plant a bomb in the downtown office of a high-ranking businessman. Although everything goes according to her plan, the garbage bin in which she places the bomb is emptied by a cleaner immediately after she leaves and later explodes in an elevator, killing four people.

Philippa is tracked down by the Carabinieri, arrested, and brought to the station where Filippo works. When she is questioned, she reveals that she is an English teacher at a local school where several students have recently died of drug-related causes. Discovering that they had all been supplied by the same local cartel, she had contacted the Carabinieri with the names of the drug ring leaders, begging them to intervene, but was repeatedly ignored.

At her wits' end, she decided to kill the leader of the cartel, the businessman whose office she targeted. In the process of her interrogation, Filippo (who is translating her confession for his superiors) falls in love with Philippa and helps her escape from Carabinieri custody. After she kills the drug lord who was her original target, the pair become fugitives from the law and flee to the countryside, where they eventually find refuge with one of Philippa's friends and finally consummate their relationship.

When the authorities raid the house where they are hiding, the fugitives steal a Carabinieri helicopter parked on the front lawn and escape by air. The officers on the ground fire repeatedly at them, to no avail, as the craft climbs higher and higher and finally disappears.

Cast
 Cate Blanchett - Philippa
 Giovanni Ribisi - Filippo
 Remo Girone - The Father
 Stefania Rocca - Regina
 Alessandro Sperduti - Ariel

Critical reception
Heaven received generally positive reviews from critics. The site's critical consensus reads, "The story is the weakest link in this gorgeous and well-acted film." Metacritic assigned the film a weighted average score of 68 out of 100, based on 31 critics, indicating "generally favorable reviews".

Though comparisons abound to Kieślowski's earlier films, Roger Ebert also saw a similarity to Tykwer's Run Lola Run and The Princess and the Warrior. Though Heaven is "more thoughtful, proceeds more deliberately, than the mercurial haste" of Tykwer's films, "it contains the same sort of defiant romanticism, in which a courageous woman tries to alter her fate by sheer willpower."

References

External links
 

2002 films
2000s English-language films
English-language French films
English-language German films
English-language Italian films
2002 crime drama films
2002 crime thriller films
2002 romantic drama films
2000s romantic thriller films
2002 thriller drama films
American crime drama films
American crime thriller films
American romantic drama films
American romantic thriller films
American thriller drama films
British crime drama films
British crime thriller films
British romantic drama films
British thriller drama films
Films about terrorism in Europe
Films directed by Tom Tykwer
Films set in Turin
Films shot in Germany
Films shot in Tuscany
French crime drama films
French crime thriller films
French romantic drama films
German crime thriller films
German thriller drama films
German romantic thriller films
Italian romantic drama films
Italian crime thriller films
Italian thriller drama films
2000s Italian-language films
Films with screenplays by Krzysztof Kieślowski
Films with screenplays by Krzysztof Piesiewicz
2002 multilingual films
American multilingual films
British multilingual films
French multilingual films
German multilingual films
Italian multilingual films
2000s American films
2000s British films
2000s French films
2000s German films